H₂epom Nepōts ('Descendant of the Waters') is a reconstructed Proto-Indo-European deity who dwells in waters, and whose powers must be ritually gained or controlled by a hero who is the only one able to approach it. The motif may come from swamp gas rising from swamps and igniting. It may come from the high levels of natural gas in Ukraine, the possible proto-Indo-European homeland.

A wide range of linguistic and cultural evidence attest the holy status of the terrestrial (potable) waters *h₂ep-, venerated collectively as "the Waters" or divided into "Rivers and Springs". The cults of fountains and rivers, which may have preceded Proto-Indo-European beliefs by tens of thousands of years, was also prevalent in their tradition. Some authors have proposed *Neptonos or *H₂epom Nepōts as the Proto-Indo-European god of the waters. The name literally means "Grandson [or Nephew] of the Waters". Linguists reconstruct his name from that of the Vedic god Apám Nápát, the Roman god Neptūnus, and the Old Irish god Nechtain. Although such a god has been solidly reconstructed in Proto-Indo-Iranian religion, Mallory and Adams nonetheless still reject him as a Proto-Indo-European deity on linguistic grounds.

In the Rigveda, the god Apám Nápát is envisioned as a form of fire residing in the waters. In Celtic mythology, a well belonging to the god Nechtain is said to blind all those who gaze into it. In an old Armenian poem, a small reed in the middle of the sea spontaneously catches fire and the hero Vahagn springs forth from it with fiery hair and a fiery beard and eyes that blaze as suns. In a ninth-century Norwegian poem by the poet Thiodolf, the name sǣvar niþr, meaning "grandson of the sea", is used as a kenning for fire. Even the Greek tradition contains possible allusions to the myth of a fire-god dwelling deep beneath the sea. The phrase "νέποδες καλῆς Ἁλοσύδνης", meaning "descendants of the beautiful seas", is used in The Odyssey 4.404 as an epithet for the seals of Proteus, which is directly analogous to the phrase H₂epom Nepōts literally "Descendant of the waters".

Indo-Iranian fire and water 
In one Vedic hymn Apām Napāt is described as emerging from the water, golden, and "clothed in lightning", which has been conjectured to be a reference to fire. His regular identification with Agni, who is described  a number of times as hiding or residing in water, and comparison with other Indo-European texts, has led some to speculate about the existence of a Proto-Indo-European myth featuring a fire deity born from water.

Other such mentions include the ninth-century Skaldic poem Ynglingatal, which uses the kenning sævar niðr 'kinsman of the sea' to refer to fire, and an old Armenian poem in which a reed in the middle of the sea spontaneously catches fire, from which springs the hero Vahagn, with fiery hair and eyes that blaze like sun.

Conjectured original fireless myth 
Whether fire was an original part of Apam Napat's nature remains a matter of debate, especially since this connection is absent from the Iranian version. Hermann Oldenberg believed Apam Napat was originally an independent water deity who later came to be associated with Agni, in part because of an ancient Indian belief that water contained fire within itself, fire appearing to "enter into" water when quenched by it.

Associations with Savitr could be understood as similarly deriving from an image of the setting sun sinking into the ocean. Another theory explains the connection between fire and water through lightning, "the flash of fire born from the rainbearing clouds".

'Swamp gas' conjecture 

Based on the idea that this fire-from-water image was inspired by flaming seepage natural gas, attempts have been made to connect the name "Apam Napat" to the word "naphtha", which passed into Greek – and thence English – from an Iranian language.

However, there is only a modest amount of evidence for a link between the sacred fires of Iranian religion and petroleum or natural gas – although the account of the blowing of the 3 sacred fires out to sea from the back of the ox Srishok where, unquenched, they continue to burn on the water is suggestive – particularly in relation to hydrocarbon deposits in the Southwestern part of the Caspian Sea, exploited currently by the Absheron gas field near Baku in Azerbaijan.

The etymology of the word "naphtha" has been claimed likely to relate to the Akkadian napṭu, "petroleum".

References

Bibliography 

 

 
 

Proto-Indo-European deities
Reconstructed words
Proto-Indo-European mythology